The  was the youngest of the four shinnōke, branches of the Imperial Family of Japan which were eligible to succeed to the Chrysanthemum Throne in the event that the main line should die out. It was founded by Prince Naohito, the son of Emperor Higashiyama.

Fearing extinction of the Imperial Line, Arai Hakuseki proposed that a new branch of the Imperial Family be created. In 1718, retired emperor Reigen bestowed upon his grandson the title of Kan'in-no-miya and land worth 1000 koku.  This was the first new shinnōke formed since the Arisugawa-no-miya lineage in 1625.

The name Kan'in-no-miya is thought to have come from the title of Prince Sadamoto, a son of the Heian-era Emperor Seiwa.

Arai Hakusei's wisdom was soon proved with the second Kan'in-no-miya, Sukehito shinnō. When Emperor Go-Momozono died, he had only a single daughter. Sukehito's son was chosen to become Emperor Kōkaku.

The Kan'in House became extinct upon the death of its 5th head, Prince Kan'in Naruhito, in 1842, but was revived by Emperor Meiji, who assigned the name to Prince Kotohito, 16th son of Prince Fushimi Kuniie (one of the other shinnoke houses).

The line became extinct again with the death of his son, Kan'in Sumihito (formerly Kan'in-no-miya Haruhito shinnō) in 1988.

References
 Keane, Donald. Emperor Of Japan: Meiji And His World, 1852-1912. Columbia University Press (2005). 
 Lebra, Sugiyama Takie. Above the Clouds: Status Culture of the Modern Japanese Nobility. University of California Press (1995). 

 
Japanese nobility